Variations Part I&II is Croatian pianist Maksim Mrvica's third album, including his first (non-international) album, "Gestures".

Track listing
Kolibre (Tonči Huljić) - 3:45
Piano Concerto No. 1 in B-flat minor, Op. 23 (Pyotr Ilyich Tchaikovsky) - 4:05
Merry Christmas Mr. Lawrence (Ryuichi Sakamoto) - 3:50
Totentanz (Franz Liszt) - 4:41
Olympic Dream (David Essex) - 3:48
Amazonic (Tonči Huljić) - 3:20
LeeLoo's Tune (Tonči Huljić) - 3:52
Procession of The Sardar (from Caucasian Sketches, Suite No. 1) (Mikhail Ippolitov-Ivanov) - 4:10
Bohemian Rhapsody (Freddie Mercury) - 6:41
Pictures at an Exhibition (Modest Mussorgsky) - 12:28
Etude in D-sharp minor, Op. 8, No. 12 (Alexander Scriabin) - 4:12
Nocturne Op. 9, No. 2 in E-flat Major (Frédéric Chopin) - 5:00
Aria From Goldberg Variations (Johann Sebastian Bach) - 3:58
Pagrag (Niccolò Paganini/Maksim Mrvica) - 5:30

Maksim Mrvica albums
2004 albums